Fossils is an Indian hard rock band from Bengal formed in Kolkata, West Bengal, India in 1998.
The group is considered one of the pioneering rock acts in Kolkata's Bengali music scene.
The band currently comprises Rupam Islam (lead vocals, additional guitars), Deep Ghosh (rhythm guitar), Allan Temjen Ao (lead guitar), Tanmoy Das (drums), Prasenjit 'Pom' Chakraborty (bass guitar).

Their music is flavoured by a blend of blues, rock and psychedelia, along with Rupam Islam's vocal renditions of his characteristic psychoanalytical lyrics.
They are noted for their social commentary and advocation of causes such as the welfare of HIV positive people.

History

Formation and early years: 1998–2000
The band was formed by Rupam Islam, the vocalist. Their first stage show was held on 9 January 1999 at Najrul Mancha for Gaan 99 organised by HMV. While performing on stage as Rupam Islam and group, on that very day Rupam announced that henceforth he will perform as Fossils. This show had Deep on acoustic guitar, Deep Ghosh on guitars, Tanmoy on bass, Rajiv on drums and Rupam. This line up was short lived and the very next show saw Chandra and Teno on guitars, Baji on drums, Bumpy on bass, Jatu on keyboards and Rupam.

The group started to call themselves "Fossils" after a suggestion by their guitarist Deep.
The name is inspired by a line from one of Rupam's lyrics:
"Khoro aamar fossil, onubhutir michhil protikriashil kono biplobe".

Initial audience reaction to the band's music was not encouraging. During their first few shows, they met with jeering and hostile objection to the rock style and techniques they employed.

Thus, the band name was meant to convey a sense of an "underground" movement that the members felt they had initiated and their belief that they would be fossilised into history under the pressure of social disapproval of their music, only to be excavated decades later by musicologists wishing to discover the roots of Bengali rock.

The band would experience a flurry of line-up changes until the end of 1999, by which time a sort of permanency was achieved with Rupam  (vocals), Chandra (bass), Allan (guitar), Stephen (drums), Indra (keyboards), and Parikhshit (manager) as the members.

In spite of the hostile feedbacks, the band decided to stick to their sound, and for the first time in the history of Indian Bengali rock, a full-fledged, continuous, effort was made to establish the Bengali rock sound.

Fossils: 2000–2003
In 2000, the band recorded a demo version of their tracks. They faced rejection several times from different record houses.

In 2001, the guitarist Allan left the band for a corporate career. Former members Teno and Deep re-joined in Allan's stead.

A contract was landed with Asha Audio and by the end of the same year, recording for the band's first studio album began. The recording had to start without Allan, whose departure was so sudden there was not enough time to rework their tracks. Some of the guitar tracks for this album had to be lifted from the demo version.
The album was entitled Fossils and released in 2002.
It was not an instant success, but the music caught on once the FM radio stations started broadcasting the tracks. The album's popularity has increased with time, and today it has achieved a cult following.

Teno left the band in 2002 and was replaced by Partha.

In 2003, the drummer Stephen underwent rehabilitation. Andre served as part-time drummer till Bubun joined.

By this time, the band had created a nice audience and dedicated following among the youth.

Fossils 2: 2004–2005
The band's second album, entitled Fossils 2, was released in 2004.
It was then noted as the Bengali band album with the highest budget to date.
The album was partly sponsored by the Thums Up brand.
The mastering engineer was Steve Fallone of Sterling Sound, New York.

The band witnessed a surge in popularity.

In 2005, the manager Parikshit was expelled from the band; Rupam and Deep jointly took over his work. As of 2007, management has been handled by Deep and Rupam's wife Rupsha Dasgupta.

Mission F: 2006
The band's third studio album, entitled Mission F, was released in 2006.
It was a theme album for the first Kolkata Police Friendship Cup Football Tournament.

A special track, "Aeka Nauo", dedicated to HIV positive people, was included in the album. It featured Usha Uthup and was produced in collaboration with the Kolkata Sukriti Foundation.
A free VCD distributed with the album contains the music video for the track, which shows HIV positive people with their faces uncovered interacting freely with Uthup and the band members.
The VCD also contained a chat session with band members.

Radio Mirchi collaborated with the band to produce two "unplugged" versions of previously recorded tracks that were included in the album.

According to a survey conducted by Radio Mirchi, Mission F was declared the best-selling album in Kolkata for the year 2006.

On Earth Day, the band covered Michael Jackson's Earth Song in Bengali exclusively for the news channel CNN IBN.

Aupodartho: 2007
In the first half of 2007, Rupam Islam worked on a separate project named RnB with the bassist Bumpy.

In the second half of 2007, the band released a music video album entitled Aupodartho.

The album was scheduled to be launched in Music World, Park Street, Kolkata. The crowd turnout was so unexpectedly huge that fans had to be turned out and the outlet's premises closed. The police had a tough time controlling the crowd. The release eventually happened on the same day, with Rupam Islam placing himself atop a stool outside the outlet and addressing the fans without a microphone.

During the Pujas of 2007, Rupam Islam's 1998 solo album was re-launched by Sa Re Ga Ma HMV.

On 9 November, Fossils played lived for the first time in Bangladesh at the Dhaka Rock Fest 2007, the first ever international Bengali rock festival.

Fossils 3: 2008–2013
Fossils featured in the Rolling Stone India magazine in 2008.

The end of 2008 saw Fossils begin the recording of their fifth studio album, which was released on 19 September 2009. It was titled Fossils 3 and developed as a concept album. It endeavours to tell the story of a mysterious character known only as Shada Jama (White Shirt) through the interlinked audio tracks as well as a separate graphic account contained in the inlay cards. Mayookh Bhowmick on the distortion tabla, Indrajit Dey (Indra) on the keyboards, and a team from the Kolkata Music Academy Chamber Orchestra led by Abraham Mazumder were the guest contributors to the album. Fossils 3 would go on to win in the Best Non-Film Album category of the Anandalok Awards 2009.

2009 marked the band's tenth anniversary.

The band's official fan club, Fossils Force, was launched the same year, which started their operations through a blood donation camp on 1 May 2009. They continue to engage in activities for social welfare, such as contributing to the relief of people affected by the Cyclone Aila and another blood donation camp in 2010.

Rupam on the Rocks, written by Rupam Islam and published by Ananda Publishers was launched at the Kolkata Book Fair 2009.

The same year saw Fossils touring the UK and Bangalore.

2010 started with a change in the line-up. Bubun was replaced by Tanmoy on the drums.

In July 2010, the band played live at Nashville in the United States.

Later in the year, Rupam Islam won a National Film Award (Silver Lotus or Rajat Kamal) in the Best Male Playback Singer category from the Government of India for his work in the film Mahanagar @ Kolkata.

June 2011, Allan rejoined the band in place of Partha.

September 2011, Fossils visited Dhaka, Bangladesh for the third time.

July 2012, Fossils performed at Las Vegas, USA; which was a huge hit.

Fossils 4: 2015
The sixth studio album of the band is scheduled to be released on 19 October 2013 at City Centre II, Rajarhat – Kolkata. For the first time, the band has soft launched their album "Fossils 4" as full-length online streaming to the audience days before physical release of the album. It is also the first time the band holds both copyright and publishing rights of this album while INRECO will do the distribution and marketing.
Sayantan the drummer joined as Tanmoy went for a degree. Tanmoy will be rejoining sooner as heard by the fans. another young artist from Kolkata, is set to join the band in 2017 as a bass guitarist and lyricist.

Discography 

 Fossils 1  (2002)
 Aro Ekbar
 Ekla Ghor
 Nemesis
 Hasnuhana
 Dekho Manashi
 Bishakta Manush
 Nishkraman
 Millennium
 Fossils 2 (2004)
 Keno Korle
 Manob Boma
 Chhal
 Harano Podok
 Tritiyo Bishwa
 Acid
 29 Se October
 Bicycle Chor
 Shasti
 Mission F (2006)
 Etwastata
 Sototar Bilashita
 Manob Boma
 Friendship Chai
 Bondhu He
 Kichuta Somoy
 Bishakta Manush
 Eka Naow
 Sono Amra Ki
 Hari Na
 Aupodartho (2007)
 Aupodartho [Video Album]
 Fossils 3 (2009)
 Swabhabhik Khoon
 Maa
 Danober Utthan
 Guru
 Phire Chaulo
 Bidroher Pandulipi
 Mummy
 Bhoot Ar Tilottoma 1
 Dhongsho Romonthon
 Haspatale
 Mrityu: Mrityur Pore
 Railline-e Mrityu
 Schizophrenic Bra
 Bhoot Ar Tilottoma 2
 Fossils 4 (2013)
 Khnoro Aamar Fossil
 Bñaador
 Haajar Bichhana
 Mohakaash
 Baari Esho
 Shoytaan
 Resolutions
 Sthaabor Austhaabor
 Mrityu
 Fossils 5 (2017)
 Janla
 Stobdho Jibon
 Mrito Manush
 Palao
 Fossils 6 (2019)
 Ghreena
 Hridoy Bhangbar Gaan
 Dewali Pee

Gallery

See also
 Rupam Islam
 Music of India
 Indian rock

References

External links
 Rupam Islam's Official Site
 Interview with Rupam Islam on his playback singing in "Jannat"
 Rupam Islam: A profile
 Interview with Rupam Islam on Fossils
 The Telegraph reports on Fossils 3 pre-release buzz
 The Times of India reports on Bengali rock bands
 Rupam Islam and composer Debojyoti Mishra talk about the history of comic songs in Bengal
 The Telegraph reports on the impact of a new generation of singers on Bengali film music

Indian progressive rock groups
Musical groups established in 1998
Bengali musical groups